Barningham Green is a village in Norfolk, England.

The villages name means 'Homestead/village of Beorn's people'.

References 
http://kepn.nottingham.ac.uk/map/place/Norfolk/Barningham%20North%20or%20Norwood

Villages in Norfolk
North Norfolk